Jean Baptiste Émile Vidal (18 June 1825 – 16 June 1893) was a French dermatologist who was a native of Paris.

He studied medicine in Tours and Paris, becoming médecin des hôpitaux in 1862. For much of his career he was associated with the Hôpital Saint-Louis (1867–1890) in Paris. In 1883 he became a member of the Académie de Médecine.

In 1893, Vidal was the first to recognize and define the transmission of herpes simplex virus from one person to another. 

He is remembered for his investigations of lupus and skin lichenification. His name is associated with "pityriasis circinata et marginata of Vidal", a disorder that is synonymous to pityriasis rosea, and "Vidal's disease", an historical name for lichen simplex chronicus.

Publications 
 Considérations sur le rhumatisme articulaire chronique primitif, 1855
 Du Pityriasis, 1877
 Inoculabilité de quelques affections cutanées, 1877
 Du pityriasis circiné et marginé, 1882
 Étude sur le mycosis fongoïde with L .Brocq, Paris : A. Delahaye et E. Lecrosnier, 1885 
 Acne molluscum contagiosum" généralisée ; acné varioliforme (de Bazin) généralisée, 1889.

Notes

References 
 Jean Baptiste Emile Vidal @ Who Named It

1825 births
1893 deaths
French dermatologists
Physicians from Paris